Kosovo is home to five large lakes. The largest of these is Gazivoda Lake, in the north-western part of Kosovo in the municipality of Zubin Potok. These are five of the largest lakes in Kosovo:

Gazivoda Lake is shared between Kosovo and Serbia. The total area of the lake is 11.9 km², while Serbia has less than one third of it (2.7 km²).
Fierza Lake is shared between Kosovo and Albania. The total area of the lake is 73 km², while Kosovo only encompasses 2.46 km² of it.

Other lakes

Other, smaller lakes are to be found in Kosovo as well. These three lakes are located in the west and are all fed by tributaries of the South Morava:
 Përlepnicë Lake
 Livoq Lake
 Ruboc Lake
 Tropojë Lake

Many smaller beautiful lakes are found on the mountains (Prokletije and Šar Mountains). Leqinat lake and Small Lićenat Lake are found on Liqenat mountain, and Zemra Lake and Gjeravica Lake are found near the peak of Gjeravica.

See also

References 

Lakes